Al-Shati, also known as Beach camp, is a Palestinian refugee camp located in the northern Gaza Strip along the Mediterranean Sea coastline in the Gaza Governorate, and more specifically Gaza City. The camp's total land area consists of 520 dunums. According to the Palestinian Central Bureau of Statistics (PCBS), al-Shati had a population of 87,158 inhabitants in mid-year 2006, while the United Nations Relief and Works Agency (UNRWA) reports a population of 78,800 registered refugees. The camp is the third largest refugee camp in the Palestinian Territories.

History
Al-Shati was established in 1948 for about 23,000 Palestinians fleeing the cities of Jaffa, Lod and Beersheba as well as surrounding villages during the 1948 Arab-Israeli War. In 1971, Israeli authorities demolished over 2,000 shelters for the purpose of widening the roads for security reasons. About 8,000 refugees were forced to leave the camp to the nearby housing project in Sheikh Radwan in Gaza City.

Economy
Before September 2000, when Israel closed off its border with the Gaza Strip due to the violence of the Second Intifada, the majority of al-Shati's work force were laborers in Israel or worked in agriculture. Today, some refugees work in workshops and sewing factories. A sizable number of the camp's 2453 families depend on fishing for income. It contains a sewage system, a health center and 23 schools (17 primary, 6 secondary).

People from Al-Shati
 Ismail Haniya, de facto Prime Minister of the Palestinian National Authority
 Rashid Masharawi, filmmaker
 Said Seyam, assassinated Interior Minister of the Palestinian National Authority based in Gaza
 Yasser Elshantaf, Palestinian businessman living in Germany

See also
 Canada Camp (1972)
 Brazil project (1973)
 Shuqairi project (1973)
 Sheikh Radwan project (1974)
 Al-Amal project (1979)

References

External links
 Beach, articles from UNWRA

Populated places established in 1948
Palestinian refugee camps in the Gaza Strip
Neighborhoods of Gaza City